Hull River is a national park in Queensland (Australia), 1275 km northwest of Brisbane. GIS mapping data from Queensland Department of Natural Resources (2002) showed an area of 3,240 hectares, of which about 2,100 hectares are estuarine mangroves, with the remainder being swamp forests dominated by Melaleuca and specialist Eucalypt species.
Rainfall averages 3,600 mm per year.  The park is part of the Coastal Wet Tropics Important Bird Area, identified as such by BirdLife International because of its importance for the conservation of lowland tropical rainforest birds.

The former Hull River Aboriginal Settlement was located in this park.

Hull River is a habitat for 267 species of animals and 522 species of plants. The average elevation of the terrain is 32 meters.

See also

 Protected areas of Queensland

References

External links
 Dave Kimble's Rainforest Photo Catalog 2400+ images taken at Hull River wetland locations.  Mostly taxonomy of rainforest plants, also fungi, cassowaries, other birds, insects, spiders, ecosystems. Links to photo essays.

National parks of Far North Queensland
Protected areas established in 1968
1968 establishments in Australia
Important Bird Areas of Queensland